Levent Çoker (born 21 November 1958) is a Turkish musician, arranger, conductor and composer who represented Turkey in the Eurovision Song Contest as a composer, arranger and conductor in 1996 and 1997. His song "Dinle" won 3rd place in Eurovision Song Contest 1997 and was the country's best result since it began participating in the Contest, and remained so until 2003, when soprano pop star Sertab Erener attained the top spot.

Born in the northwestern Anatolia city of İzmit, the administrative center of Kocaeli Province, Levent Çoker completed his primary education in İskenderun in the south of Turkey. In 1971, he enrolled at the Ankara State Conservatory to study musical performance with emphasis on playing the trombone. He was a member of Istanbul State Symphony Orchestra from 1979 to 2009 and has composed for opera and ballet as well as for symphony orchestras and bands, along with winning several national music contests.

References

Works 
 Hayal Yolcuları [The Dream Passengers] (ballet)
 Senfonik Süit [Symphonic Suite]
 Fanfare for Brass and Percussion
 Keman, Çello ve Piyano için Trio [Trio for Violin, Cello and Piano]

External links 
Lyrics by Mehtap Alnitenmiz {in Turkish} for the 3rd place song, "Dinle" (music composed and conducted by Levent Çoker) at the 1997 Eurovision Song Contest (ESC) website
Levent Çoker capsule biography {in Turkish} at the Türk Tromboncular website

References

Turkish composers
People from İzmit
1958 births
Living people
Date of birth missing (living people)
Ankara State Conservatory alumni

Eurovision Song Contest conductors